Yury Filaretovich Tsuranov (2 January 1936 – 15 March 2008) was a Soviet Olympic skeet shooter. He competed at the 1968, 1972 and the 1976 Summer Olympics and finished in 4th, 13th and 10th place, respectively. Between 1958 and 1975 Tsuranov won three individual and seven team gold medals at the world championships; he became European champion 10 times and Soviet champion 11 times. He had the world's best result (200 out of 200) in 1971. Earlier at the 1963 Soviet Championships Tsuranov and his rival Yevgeni Petrov hit 200 targets out of 200, followed by three series of 25 out of 25. Then the jury stopped the contest and awarded gold medals to both shooters.

Tsuranov graduated from the Moscow institute of noble metals and since 1960 lived in Sverdlovsk. He was the head coach of the Soviet (1978–79) and Russian (1978–89) shooting teams.

Tsuranov died in 2008. He was survived by sons Aleksandr and Konstantin. Konstantin competed in skeet shooting at the 2008 Summer Olympics.

References

External links
 

1936 births
2008 deaths
People from Nerchinsky District
Soviet male sport shooters
Olympic shooters of the Soviet Union
Shooters at the 1968 Summer Olympics
Shooters at the 1972 Summer Olympics
Shooters at the 1976 Summer Olympics
Sportspeople from Zabaykalsky Krai